Lingon Mountain is a  elevation mountain summit located in the Chugach Mountains, in Anchorage Municipality in the U.S. state of Alaska. Precipitation runoff from the peak drains into Turnagain Arm. This mountain's unofficial name refers to the  lingonberry. Other berry-theme peaks nearby include Highbush Peak, Lowbush Peak, Nagoon Mountain, Blueberry Hill, and Bearberry Point.

Climate

Based on the Köppen climate classification, Lingon Mountain is located in a subarctic climate zone with long, cold, snowy winters, and mild summers. Weather systems coming off the Gulf of Alaska are forced upwards by the Chugach Mountains (orographic lift), causing heavy precipitation in the form of rainfall and snowfall. Winter temperatures can drop below −20 °C with wind chill factors below −30 °C. This climate supports a small unnamed glacier on its south slope. The months May through June offer the most favorable weather for climbing or viewing.

See also

List of mountain peaks of Alaska
Geology of Alaska

References

External links

 Highbush Peak weather forecast

Mountains of Alaska
Mountains of Anchorage, Alaska
North American 1000 m summits